Lee Joo-bin (Korean: 이주빈; born September 18, 1989) is a South Korean actress and model. She is best known for her roles in Be Melodramatic (2019), Hello Dracula (2020), Find Me in Your Memory (2020), She Would Never Know (2021), Doctor Lawyer (2022), and Money Heist: Korea – Joint Economic Area (2022).

Career
Lee is a former DSP trainee who almost debuted as a member of the girl group Rainbow in 2009.

Filmography

Film

Television series

Web series

Music video appearances

Awards and nominations

References

External links 

 at SWMP 
 
 
 

1989 births
Living people
South Korean film actresses
South Korean television actresses
Dongduk Women's University alumni
21st-century South Korean actresses
South Korean female models